Elżbieta Radziszewska (born 6 January 1958 in Białocin) is a Polish politician. She was elected to the Sejm on 25 September 2005, getting 16,199 votes in the Piotrków Trybunalski electoral district, representing the Civic Platform party. Since 30 April 2008 she is the Plenipotentiary for Equality.

She was also a member of Sejm 1997-2001 and Sejm 2001-2005.

See also
Members of Polish Sejm 2005-2007

External links
Elżbieta Radziszewska - parliamentary page - includes declarations of interest, voting record, and transcripts of speeches.

1958 births
Living people
Members of the Polish Sejm 2005–2007
Members of the Polish Sejm 1997–2001
Members of the Polish Sejm 2001–2005
Women members of the Sejm of the Republic of Poland
Civic Platform politicians
20th-century Polish women politicians
21st-century Polish women politicians
Members of the Polish Sejm 2007–2011
Members of the Polish Sejm 2011–2015